Netty may refer to:

 Netty (software), a Java project
 North East England (Geordie) dialect for toilet or public convenience

Netty (name)

See also
 Westoe Netty

Nethy (disambiguation)
 Natty (disambiguation)
Netta (disambiguation)
Netti (disambiguation)
Netto (disambiguation)
Nettie (disambiguation)
 Nitty (disambiguation)
 Nutty